Giancarlo Pallavicini (Desio, February 12, 1931) is an economist, academic, manager, Italian writer and journalist, former adviser to the Soviet Government at the time of Gorbachev's Perestroika and member of the Russian Academy of Natural Sciences, of which the Encyclopedia Treccani noted that in the 1950s anticipated the first concepts of "marketing" and, in 1960, the first foundations of corporate social responsibility, with the "Method of decomposition parameters".

Biography
In the 1950s, 1960s and 1970s was active in Banca Cariplo and as a university professor, writer and journalist of economics columnist for "The Sun", then "Il Sole 24 Ore", in 1980 he was appointed chief consultant to financial institutions and governments, organization of the United Nations and businesses, strategy and finance, in 1990 and 2000 he became president of academic science and international organizations of science and culture.

Soviet and Russian work
At the start of perestroika, at the invitation of the Soviet Government's attention turns to the Russian Giancarlo Pallavicini.

Adviser to the Government
In the mid-1980s the Soviet government appointed him the first Western consultant for Perestroika and then the Russian Federation appointed him to the State Committee for the reform of the economy, given its ability to combine economy and instances of man and his environment cultural, social and natural environment [1]. In this capacity opposes the issuance of an anti-monopoly law apply immediately and this weakens the position of Gorbachev urged to privatize by people and groups interested in an easy acquisition of the means of production and resources of the country, and will therefore affect the subsequent political developments, with Yeltsin that will prove to be less inclined to combine free market and social responsibility.

Academic of Sciences
For his contribution to the creation and activities of the "International Foundation Kondratiev" IKF-of which he is vice president since 1992 [3] and for studies conducted at the "Pitirim Sorokin-Nicolai Kondratieff International Institute" (USA-Russia [4]), as co-founder and member of the Scientific Committee, both active at the Institute of Economics of the Academy of Sciences in Moscow-Ras, Giancarlo Pallavicini is the first Western scientist named Academic of Sciences of the Russian Federation, Rans, section " Prognosis and cycles of the economy "in 1998, and there Dec. 5, 2000, he was awarded the title of" Knight of science and art ", reserved for academics. This recognition follows also the role he plays in 1988 as vice president of the "Consortium Masterpieces of Art", established in Moscow and St. Petersburg, attended the Academy of Sciences and the University premises, which has also promoted and carried out the cataloging of the famous "Gallery Tretiacov" in Moscow, thanks to the contribution by Italy's "Olivetti SpA" [5].

Association Myr Culture
As part of Russian culture, with the Italian writers Alberto Moravia and Mario Rigoni Stern and the Russians Dmitry Likhachov, Sergej Averincev, Nikolai Samvelian and Metropolitan Filaret, was among the founders of the International Association for Intellectual and Creative "Myr Culture "set up by Raisa Gorbaceva to bring together the intelligentsia of the Soviet Union, including marginalized by the regime, and later extended to Western European countries and the United States, of which he is president Giancarlo Pallavicini since 1992 [6]. 1.1.4. - On behalf of the Russian Government, in 1996, "Myr Culture" in the former Soviet intelligentsia meets the Bolshoi Theatre in Moscow for a common confrontation with Prime Minister Viktor Stepanovich Chernomyrdin, on "dominant culture in the world today: responsibility of a creative for the future of Russia ", which leads to some changes in the law. [7] 1".

"Manifesto of the Three"
With the academic Petersburg Dmitry Sergeyevich Likhachov, at the time exponent of Russian culture, and the writer of Armenian origin Nicolai Samvelian is editor and signatory of the Manifesto of the Three, which is presented to the world press gathered at the Foro Italico in Rome, in ' during the visit of Gorbachev in Italy, as an instance of freedom and integration for the Soviet culture and the world, which are attributed to significant influences in subsequent cultural developments of the Soviet Union. [8] Since the start of the 2000s is delegated and responsible CIP - Committee an inter Italy / Russia "Rotary International", District 2040 [9].

Italian work
Prior to joining Russia Giancarlo Pallavicini is in charge of economy and finance, paying particular attention to the relational aspects of the economy with other disciplines regarding the man and his cultural environment, social and natural environment, which are the leitmotif of his work .

Encyclopedia Treccani: Method of decomposition of the parameters
In the Encyclopedia Treccani [10] Giancarlo Pallavicini appears as the inventor, in 1960, of a method of calculating the results do not directly cost of business, the method of decomposition of the parameters, which anticipated the current developments of social responsibility business, as confirmed by several sources [11], whose concepts were then taken up and developed by Robert Edward Freeman in an essay of 1984. [12] He also worked as consultant to the Soviet government, later Russian, for perestroika, as well as academic science of the Russian Federation and member of international institutions of science and culture. Marketing and large scale distribution [edit]

Marketing, large-scale distribution and collective forms of guarantee
Giancarlo Pallavicini is credited with anticipation, in the 1950s, concepts of business address close to current Marketing Management, published in "Bank and market research" in the university magazine "Economy" [13] and then taken up and developed by Philip Kotler in his essay of 1967, [14] and definitions that he formulates in the 1960s for the Association of the large retail units, a text published in 1968, will be a reference for the national legislation and to address community [15].

Economics and Finance
At the Research Department of "Cariplo" carries out research and case studies and then take care of organization and special credits, and finally direct the Marketing sector, which leaves the start in 1983 of the "Studio Pallavicini - research methods and" dedicated to the advanced management systems and consulting for strategy and finance. [16] Also assumes the post of secretary of the statutory bodies (Council, Committee and Assembly) of "Mediofactoring SpA", the Group Cariplo [17], and "CGM International SpA", trading Cariplo Bank, Generali Insurance and Transport MERZARIO. He continued his efforts in Italy of the Banque Cantonal Vaudoise of Lausanne and the Holding Norfinance of Lausanne / Geneva as Counsellor 'Administration "Norfinance Italy" in Milan, later renamed "Opera Sim", which also participates in "Invesco" [18] . In the early 1980s the world is on the board of the Italian banking '"Italian Association of World Trade", consisting of Confindustria, Confcommercio, ABI, ACRI. In the 1980s and until 1998 he is the founder and President of "Euroconsulting" Russian-Italian joint ventures in collaboration with a Prefecture Moscow for management training and development of small business, which is in Moscow business categories and export consortia Italian.

Economic and Financial Affairs
He was administrator of "Norfinance Italia", Milan, (Norfinance Holding, Lausanne; Banque Cantonale Vaudoise, Losanne; Invesco, London), since 1994; Secretary general of Mediofactoring, Milan (Banca Cariplo), since 1983, and CGM International, Milan (Banca Cariplo, Generali Assicurazioni, Merzario, since 1983), Chairman Euroconsulting j.v., Moscow, since 1988; proprietor Firm Pallavicini, Research and Methods, Desio (Milan), since 2000.

Academic activities
In the academic environment, with Luigi Riva Guatri and Enzio Cortese Palaces, in the 1960s is the creator and inventor of the "Pralt" - Research organization between Università Bocconi and the "Research and Documentation Centre of the European Communities" - and over the years 1970 with the same Guatri and Aldo Spranzi, participates in the creation of the "CESCOM", Centre for Studies on trade Bocconi University, and is coordinator of research conducted by the University Bocconi with the Catholic University of Milan, commissioned by the Entity Regione Lombardia [19]. In December 1976, the Executive Committee of the "SDA Bocconi School of Management, appointed him professor of" Economics of commercial distribution "Master of the program. [20] In the 1980s, at the dawn of perestroika, at the" CREATE "- Center for Economic Company Bocconi University, for which care start-up and heads the Section for the economy of the cultural heritage and the environment [21], presents Abel Aganbegyan, Russian academician, architect of perestroika and author of the book "Perestroika in ' economy "published by Rizzoli. Hereinafter collaborates startup initiatives in Russia at SDA Bocconi School of Management, the School of Managements of St. Petersburg and Moscow for university courses. [22] In 1970 and 1980 he participated in Commissions government [23], even as a member of the "Conference of European Rectors' [24], and at the Ministry of Foreign Affairs contributes to the drafting of the" Memorandum of Understanding Cultural Italy / USSR ".

Kondratiev waves, corporate social responsibility and globalization 
Giancarlo Pallavicini, as part of the scientific committees of organizations of studies and research in Italy and abroad in which it participates [25], is still committed to deepening understanding of the long cycles of the economy-"Kondratiev waves", the new models for the evaluation of "corporate social responsibility" and the "globalization" of the economy and finance, for which an original formula and appreciated definition [26] and on which, in the 1990s and 2000s, was the speaker in different areas, including Havana, Vatican City, Moscow / St Petersburg and Jakarta, proposing the method of decomposition of the parameters and, in the 1st quarter 2009, in Frankfurt, Milan, Brescia, Rovigo and Lonato sul Garda. [ 27]. It is a scholar of the Economy of Communion of the Focolare Movement, founded by Chiara Lubich, which is advocate and adviser.

See also

Method of decomposition of parameters, such as its creator in the sixties corporate social responsibility, for the concepts advanced by the aforementioned method Robert Edward Freeman, for the recovery and development of the concepts above Perestroika, for his role as advisor to the Soviet and Russian governments Mikhail Gorbachev, the Soviet government for advice for Perestroika Leonid Abalkin, Perestroika and for collaboration on the Economics Institute of the Academy of Sciences Globalization, for the definition and studies presented to the Vatican, in Moscow, Cuba, Frankfurt, Milan and Brescia Myr Culture, for his role as co-founder and president since 1992 Kondratiev waves, for the studies at the International Foundation Kondratiev-Mosca/Leningrado International Foundation Kondratiev, as co-founder and vice president Pitirim Sorokin-Nicolai Kondratieff International Institute, as co-founder and member of the Scientific Committee Yourii Yacovets, for his cooperation in the section "Prognosis and Cycles" Academy RANS, and the IKF-Pitirim Sorokin Nikolai Kondratieff International Institute Valentina Bondarenko, collaboration as Director dell'IKF and Pitirim Sorokin-Nikolai Kondratieff International Institute Università Commerciale Luigi Bocconi, for the studies and activities svoltavi Supermarket chains, for the original definitions and roles Desio and recalls in his voice, his hometown Economy, for the concept of economy attentive to relational aspects Marketing, for the anticipation in "The Economy", 1959 of the concepts of marketing management Philip Kotler, for the development of the concepts above Academy of Mediterranean Studies, for his role in the Scientific Committee Micah Studies Center, for his role in the Scientific Committee Dmitry Likhachov, for the "Manifesto of the three" and the Co-Presidency "Myr Culture" Nicolaj Sanvelian, for the "Manifesto of the three" and the co-founding of "Culture Myr" Fazil Iskander, for the Co-Presidency "Myr Culture" Sergei Averintzev, for the common role in "Myr Culture" Focolare Movement, for the sharing of spirituality Economy of Communion for study and dissemination Chiara Lubich, for epistolary contacts with the founder of the Focolare Movement and creator of the Economy of Communion External links [edit]
Pallavicini, Giancarlo Universal Biographical Encyclopedia, 2007 edition, vol. 14, Institute of the Italian Treccani Biographies Portal Portal Economics Literature Portal Categories: Economists italianiAccademici italianiScrittori secoloScrittori Italian Italian twentieth of the twenty-secoloNati in 1931Nati 12 febbraioNati to DesioGiornalisti Italian twentieth secoloDirigenti business italianiAccademici Russian | [other]

Notes
 "Biographical Encyclopedia Universal" Treccani, 2007 edition, vol. 14 p. 617; "Treccani - Portal" week. 2008: Social Sciences / Economists / Biographies, 1990s editions of "Who's Who in Italy" and "Gold Edition", 2008, "ALICE News" - Foreign Affairs, 29.05.2008 15:35, Moscow (AP): "N / Russia Schroeder in "Club restricted" Academy of Sciences - More than 10 scientists from abroad. Pallavicini Even Italian "; relations in note 27 ^ Corriere della Sera, July 9, 2007, p. 23, note to Sergio Romano, Italian Ambassador to Moscow during Perestroika own ^ Internet: "IKF"-International Foundation Kondratiev ^ Among others: "Return of Pitirim Sorokin," from pag.194, "The Limits of the russian way to the market and of globalization of the economy: tho extremes heading towards the same destination, confirmation of Pitirim Sorokin's forecasts", published by SAKravchenko and NEPokrovsky, Moscow, 2001 on behalf of both entities mentioned and the American University in Moscow ^ Publications in the Academy and its organizations of studies and research, and in particular "Return of Pitirim Sorokin," works cited, and press d 'Italian media, including "The Citizen" 09/03/1998, p. 13 and 03.03.2003, p. 2, "The Day" 11.04.2007 and Treccani work and portal cited ^ Treccani, opera and portal cited, Who's Who, editions quoted; Ansa-R, N. 0491, 19.05.2003, "The Day" 16.05.2003 and 20.05.2005 pag.XI; "Citizen" 05/03/2003 and "The Day, it" Chronicle Milan 20.05.2003 for renewal of appointment; "Myr Russia-Italy Culture "in the brochure" 40 years of the Italian-Russian Chamber of Commerce ", Moscow, 2004; Russian press, including" Literaturnaia Gazeta ", 6.12.1995," Moskovskie Novosti "10.12.1995," MK-Moscovskij Komsomoletz "14.12.1996, "Obshaya Gazeta" and publications of "Myr Culture" in Moscow, including "The World of Culture in this Characters", 1989 ^ "Forum of the artistic Intelligentsia of Russia", Myr Culture, Bolshoi Theatre, Moscow, May 1996 ^ Newspapers information and archives of the "Myr Culture" in Moscow and in Italy and "Italstat SpA" sponsoring the meeting with the world press Yearbooks ^ "Rotary International" ^ Treccani work and portal cited ^ "Structures built in the Italian distribution system," Giuffre, Milan, 1968 VII/351, in Preface and p. 54, Finance and Markets, February 3, 2009, p. 11 Mara Consoli, "When ethics becomes a bargain" New Chronicles, CNEL, Rome, 12.01.2009, Adelaide Mochi, "Award Socialis and Corporate Social Responsibility"; Bancoper Annual Meeting, Bologna, 15.11.2008, Prefect Angelo Tranfaglia, "Profit and social responsibility," p. 12, the reports cited in note 27 ^ "Strategic Management: A Stakeholder Approach" ^ "Banks and market research", in "The Economy", Free International University of Social Studies, Rome, November 1959, Università Commerciale Luigi Bocconi, Milan, Academic Year 1979-1980, Tesi Fabio Storer, "The Marketing in Italy: a historical analysis " ^ "Marketing Management" and later texts ^ Aigid Archive - Association of Italian big business distribution, 1960, "Structures built in the Italian distribution system," work cited ^ "Chamber of Commerce II.AA." Milan REA MB-1650731 ^ Printed in 1984 Budget ^ Financial C.C.II.AA. Milan ^ Regional Council Resolution of 29 October 1971, "Report on the commercial distribution in Lombardy", Milan, 1975 ^ Communication of 20 December 1976 signed by Luigi Guatri ^ 2 to Supplement No. 23 of Bocconi News, February 23, 1989 ^ "The Day" 14.06.1988, "The Citizen" 25.06.1988 ^ Including: Minindustria funding for textile Law 1,101, the Ministries of Agriculture and Foreign Trade for promoting food products. ^ Minutes of meetings at the Ministry ^ Among others: "Academy of Mediterranean Studies" of Agrigento (www.accademiastudimed.it), "Center for Studies Micah" (www.centro-studies-michea.org), "International Foundation Kondratiev," at the Institute of Economics of '"Russian Academy of Sciences" (Moscow-St Petersburg), "Pitirim Sorokin-Nicolai Kondratieff International Institute" at the Institute of Economics of the' "Russian Academy of Sciences" (Russia, Europe, USA); "International Consortium Masterpieces of Art" (Moscow, St. Petersburg) ^ Also appear on "Globalization-Wikipedia" ^ III Encuentro Internacional de Economistas "Globalización problemas y desarrollo of" La Habana, 24/29 de Enero 2000: Giancarlo Pallavicini, "Sirven mensajes nuevos y reglas to the globalizacion, apremiada por la difusion de la Advanced Technology, para que no empeore the marginación y the exclusion of a large part of the Humanity promueva a desarrollo y hombre ya favorable to the sociedad, protegiendo los valores. A calculus de modelo de los resultados no directamente economicos: The descomposicion de los Parámetros; Vatican Foundation "Centesimus Annus- Pro Pontifical ", International Conference" Ethics and Finance ", Vatican City, April 30, 2000: Giancarlo Pallavicini," The new global era suggests a test of economics and finance in theory and practice ", International Scientific Symposium" Pitirim Sorokin and socio-cultural trends of our time ", Moscow / St. Petersburg, 4/5/6 February 1999: Giancarlo Pallavicini," The limits of the Russian way to the market and the globalization of the economy: two extremes in the same way to meta confirming the predictions of Pitirim Sorokin (acts in "Return of Pitirim Sorokin," work cited), "Zeri Foundation" -ONU/Unesco, Third World Congress ZEROS, Jakarta (Indonesia), 1997 Giancarlo Pallavicini, "Environmental limits of economic action "; Shiller Institute Conference," Rebuilding the World Economy after the Crisis Sistemic ": Giancarlo Pallavicini,"A review of current economic and financial doctrine and practice", Frankfurt area, 21,22 February 2009; Micah Studies Centre, "Financial crisis and the real economy: forecasts missed and prospects in a different capitalism", Lonato, January 24, 2009 Publications [edit]
 "Banks and market research", in "The Economy", Free International University of Social Studies, Rome, November 1959
 "The Oil Industry", special issue of "market news", the Savings Bank of the Provinces of Lombardy, Milan, 1960
 "The competition rules in the Treaty establishing the EEC in their reflections on the oil industry," in "International Economics of Renewable Energy", Bocconi University-Iefe, Giuffre Editore, Milan, 6/1960
 "The protection of freedom of competition" in the official Acts of Table Ronde, International Center for Studies and Documentation European Communities, Giuffré Editore, Milan, 1961, on p. 188

 "Tax harmonization in the EEC with particular reference to turnover d 'affairs", Working Paper - International Center for Studies and Documentation European Communities, Giuffré, Milan, 1964
 "The Oil Industry in the hundred years of its history," in Armando Sapori-Giancarlo Pallavicini, "Outlines of a century economy", Fine Paucis, Varese, 1968 from page 25
 "Structures built in the Italian distribution system," Giuffré Editore, Milan, 1968, pgs. VIII/351
 "Forms of collective security," in "Proceedings of the seminar on the problems of small and medium industries," Department of Trade and Industry - Region of Lombardy, Monza, Villa Reale, May 1971
 "Report on the commercial distribution in Lombardy", Notebooks of Industry and Trade, Agency Lombardy Region, Vol 1, Milan, 1974, edited by Giancarlo Pallavicini, pursuant to its own methodology and research and as a coordinator of the working group
 "Summary Report on the fulfillment of the search," in "Structure and retail distribution services to the community in Lombardy", Body Region, Milan, 1979 at the conclusion of a study coordinated by Giancarlo Pallavicini between Bocconi University and Catholic University, as resolution of the Regional Council of 29 October 1974
 "The Industrial Credit" in "Loans d 'Impresa", Federation of Savings Banks degli Abruzzi and Molise, 1981 from page 178
 "Financing of energy programs," in "self-generation and cogeneration", European manufacturers sets / Italian Association of electrical engineering and electronics, in INTEL - Fair of Milan, 1983
 "The third generation of the non-banking sectors," in "Ca 'de Sass," Cariplo, December 1987
 "Conference on services," City of Cream, April / December 1989, Volume I and II, edited by Giancarlo Pallavicini, Scientific Coordinator, "CREA"-Bocconi University
 "Enterprise and ecology: a report based on ethics," CIS-Centro Studi d'Impresa, Valmadrera, 1990
 "The enterprise and foreign markets: the USSR", CIS-Centro Studi d'Impresa, Valmadrera, 1990

 "Fundamentals of modern economic development: Russia today", RIA, Moscow, 1994
 "Economics and environmental protection", in "The Sound and the Word," Rotary Club International Milan San Siro, 1996 from page 97
 "The theory of long cycles of the economy, according to Kondratiev, and computer and communication" in "Universality of the media, diversity of cultures and values, unity of man", Academy of Mediterranean Studies, Agrigento, 1996
 "Nature, as an expression of the sacred, inspired by the wisdom of a limit to human?", In "The Sacred and Nature", Academy of Mediterranean Studies, Agrigento, 1997
 "The limits of economic environment," in UN / UNESCO, Third World Congress Zeri, Jakarta, 1997
 "The new global era suggests a test of economics and finance in doctrine and practice," Vatican Foundation Centesimus Annus-Pro Pontifical International Conference "Ethics and Finance", Vatican City, 2000
 "Sirven mensajes nuevos y reglas to the globalizacion" in III Encuentro Internacional de econonistas, "Globalización of desarrollo y problemas", La Habana, 2000
 "The limits of the Russian way to the market and of globalization of the economy", in "Return of Pitirim Sorokin," Edited by S.Kravchenko and N.Pokrovsky, Moscow, 2001 from p. 194
 "The new intervention assessment on cultural heritage", in "The pleasure villas of the province of Milan: problems of reuse and management in comparison", Ministry of National Heritage and Cultural Activities / Province of Milan / University Second Renaissance International, spirals, 2003
 "Freedom and Responsibility: a strategic paradigm in the global era", in "Evolution and prospects of social transformation", V International Scientific Conference Kondratiev, St. Petersburg, 2004
 "Financial crisis and the real economy: forecasts missed and prospects", Centro Studi Micah / Project Association Polesine, Rovigo, 2008
 "Financial crisis and the real economy: forecasts missed and prospects in a different capitalism", Centro Studi Micah, Lonato, 2009
 "An analysis of current economic and financial doctrine and its practice," Schiller Institute European Conference, "Rebuilding the World Economy after the Systemic Crisis", Rüsselsheim (Frankfurt), 21–22 February 2009 
 "Banking Foundations," in "Encyclopedia Treccani", 2013
 "Other works and contributions to academic and technical journals and over a thousand articles on economic newspapers, including as a columnist for "Il Sole"/"Il Sole 24 Ore", sometimes signed with pseudonyms: GCP; P.Vicini; Gianni Villapaci, in Archives of preparation and "Who's Who in Italy"-Gold Edition, 2008; "Who Writes", personality collection, Editrice IGAP, Milan, 1966; "He who is", Editrice Torinese, Torino, 1970.

Honours and awards
 Diploma Reason, Value, Honor by Russian Academy of Natural Sciences (RANS), Moscow, 2000
 Order of Knight of the Sciences and Arts, Russian Academy of Natural Sciences (RANS), Resolution number 129 of the Presidium, Moscow, 5 December 2000
 Gold Medal by International N.D. Kondratiev Foundation, 1998
 Gold Medal dy Ordine dei Giornalisti della Lombardia, 2015.
 Special Mention "Rosa Camuna 2018" by Government of the Lombardy Region.

External links
 Giancarlo Pallavicini at "Encyclopedia Treccani" website

References

1931 births
Living people
People from Desio
Academic staff of Bocconi University
Full Members of the Russian Academy of Sciences
Italian economists
Italian journalists
Italian male journalists
Italian male writers